Ezekiel Ikupolati was an Anglican bishop in Nigeria.

Ikupolati was born in Iyara on 6 June 1948.  He was educated at the Emmanuel College of Theology and Christian Education, Ibadan. A former soldier, he was ordained in 1984. He served in the  Dioceses of Kwara and Lokoja. He was then the Dean of the Church's seminary in Okene until his appointment as the Anglican Diocese of Ijumu in 2008. He retired in 2018.

Notes

Nigerian Army personnel
Living people
1948 births
Anglican deans in Africa
Anglican bishops of Ijumu
21st-century Anglican bishops in Nigeria
People from Kogi State